Losin' It is a 1983 comedy film directed by Curtis Hanson and starring Tom Cruise, Shelley Long, Jackie Earle Haley, and John Stockwell. The plot concerns four teenagers trying to lose their virginity. Losin' It was filmed largely in Calexico, California.

Plot 
Four teenagers from early 1960s Los Angeles are on their way to Tijuana, Mexico: Dave, Woody, Spider, and Dave's brother Wendell. Dave, Spider, and Woody are there to lose their virginity, while Wendell came along to buy fireworks. They end up picking up a woman named Kathy, who goes with them because she wants a fast divorce from her husband, and they get into a series of hijinks and misadventures south of the border.

Cast
 Tom Cruise as Woody
 Shelley Long as Kathy
 Jackie Earle Haley as Dave
 John Stockwell as "Spider"
 John P. Navin, Jr. as Wendell
 Henry Darrow as Sheriff
 Hector Elias as "Chuey"
 Mario Marcelino as Pablo
 John Valby as Johnny "Hotrocks"
 Rick Rossovich as Marine
 Kale Browne as Larry
 Joe Spinell as US Customs Officer
 Santos Morales as Barker At Tongaley

Reception

Critical response 
The film received negative reviews from critics. It has an 18% score on Rotten Tomatoes based on 11 reviews.

Box office
The film opened in 180 theatres in New York and Los Angeles opening with a "lackluster" $437,257 for the weekend.

Home media 

MGM released Losin' It as a Region 1 DVD on February 6, 2001. Kino Lorber released the film on Blu-ray on March 5, 2019.

References

External links 
 
 
 
 
 

1980s sex comedy films
1983 films
American independent films
American sex comedy films
American teen comedy films
Films about virginity
Canadian sex comedy films
Canadian independent films
Embassy Pictures films
1980s English-language films
Films directed by Curtis Hanson
Films set in the 1960s
American comedy road movies
1980s comedy road movies
Films set in 1965
Films set in Tijuana
Teen sex comedy films
1983 comedy films
1980s American films
1980s Canadian films